The Library of America (LOA) is a nonprofit publisher of classic American literature. Founded in 1979 with seed money from the National Endowment for the Humanities and the Ford Foundation, the LOA has published over 300 volumes by authors ranging from Mark Twain to Philip Roth, Nathaniel Hawthorne to Saul Bellow, including selected writing of several U.S. presidents.

Overview and history 
The Bibliothèque de la Pléiade ("La Pléiade") series published in France provided the model for the LOA, which was long a dream of critic and author Edmund Wilson.

The initial organizers included American academic Daniel Aaron, Lawrence Hughes, Helen Honig Meyer, and Roger W. Straus Jr. The initial board of advisers included Robert Penn Warren, C. Vann Woodward, R. W. B. Lewis, Robert Coles, Irving Howe, and Eudora Welty. Officers included Richard Poirier, Jason Epstein, Daniel Aaron, and Cheryl Hurley. Hanna M. Bercovitch served as senior editor and then editor-in-chief until her death in 1997.

The first volumes were published in 1982, ten years after Wilson's death. Besides the works of many individual writers, the series includes anthologies like Reporting World War II and (in a different format from the above illustration) Writing Los Angeles.

The publisher aims to keep classics and notable historical and genre works in print permanently to preserve America's literary and cultural heritage. Although the LOA sells more than a quarter-million volumes annually, the publisher depends on individual contributions to help meet the costs of preparing, marketing, manufacturing, and maintaining its books. Some books published as additions to the series are not kept in print in perpetuity.

Research and scholarship 
LOA volumes are prepared and edited by recognized scholars on the subject. Efforts are made to correct errors and omissions in previous editions and create a definitive version of the material. Notes on the text are normally included and the source texts identified.

For instance, the LOA text of Richard Wright's Native Son restored a number of passages that had been previously cut. The LOA commissioned a new translation of Alexis de Tocqueville's Democracy in America by Arthur Goldhammer for their edition of the text.

Each volume also includes a chronology of the author's career or significant incidents in the case of the anthology volumes.

Criticism and satire
The Library of America has attracted a number of critical notices, including accusations of selection biases and the questionable inclusion of certain writers. Marketing efforts by the LOA have been faulted as overly commercial and exploitative.

The LOA has been satirized as "confer[ing] value on writers by encasing their work in handsome black-jacketed covers with a stripe of red, white, and blue on the spine." The series even prompted a mocking poem that began:

It's like heaven: you've got to dieTo get there. And you can't be sure.The publisher might go out of business.

In an April Fools' Day swipe at the Library of America's selection standards, another satirical piece proclaimed that the LOA "would publish volumes of Paris Hilton's and William Shatner's memoirs, and possibly those of Jersey Shore's Snooki." Images of the faux volumes were included.

In his 2001 book Book Business: Publishing Past, Present, and Future LOA co-founder Jason Epstein sharply criticized the Library of America's finances and what he saw as the publication of unnecessary anthologies and authors whose qualifications for the series were suspect. He concluded:

The Library of America has now published substantially all the work for which it was created and for which rights are available. Its obligation hereafter is to husband its resources so that this work remains in print and accessible to readers, and to ensure that funds are on hand for the publication of twentieth-century writers as rights permit.

Build and manufacture 
The LOA uses paper which meets the requirements for permanence set by the American National Standards Institute. Each volume is printed on thin acid-free paper, allowing books ranging from 700 to 1,600 pages to remain fairly compact. All volumes in the main series have the same trim size.

For the hardcover editions, the binding cloth is woven rayon, and the books are Smyth-sewn. Each includes a ribbon bookmark. The uniform typeface is Galliard.

The LOA publishes selected titles in paperback, mainly for the college textbook market.

Main series

Special anthologies 
 Writing New York (Phillip Lopate, ed. 1998)  
 American Sea Writing (Peter Neill, ed. 2000)  
 Baseball (Nicholas Dawidoff, ed. 2002)  
 Writing Los Angeles (David L. Ulin, ed. 2002)  
 Americans in Paris (Adam Gopnik, ed. 2004)  
 American Writers at Home (J. D. McClatchy, author, Erica Lennar, photographer 2004)  
 American Movie Critics (Phillip Lopate, ed. 2006) 
 American Religious Poems (Harold Bloom and Jesse Zuba, eds., 2006) 
 American Food Writing (Molly O'Neill, ed., 2007) 
 True Crime: An American Anthology (Harold Schechter, ed., 2008) 
 Becoming Americans: Four Centuries of Immigrant Writing (Ilan Stavans, ed., 2009) 
 At the Fights: American Writers on Boxing (George Kimball and John Schulian, eds., 2011) 
 The 50 Funniest American Writers: An Anthology of Humor from Mark Twain to The Onion (Andy Borowitz ed., 2011) 
 Into the Blue: American Writing on Aviation and Spaceflight (Joseph J. Corn, ed., 2011) 
 The Cool School: Writing from America's Hip Underground (Glenn O'Brien, ed., 2013) 
 Football: Great Writing about the National Sport (John Schulian, ed., 2014) 
 Shake It Up: Great American Writing on Rock and Pop from Elvis to Jay Z (Kevin Dettmar and Jonathan Lethem, eds., 2017) 
 Basketball: Great Writing About America's Game (Alexander Wolff, ed., 2018) 
 Dance in America: A Reader's Anthology (Mindy Aloff, ed., 2018) 
 The Future Is Female! 25 Classic Science Fiction Stories by Women, from Pulp Pioneers to Ursula K. Le Guin (Lisa Yaszek, ed., 2018) 
 The Great American Sports Page: A Century of Classic Columns from Ring Lardner to Sally Jenkins (John Schulian, ed., 2019) 
 American Birds (Andrew Rubenfeld and Terry Tempest Williams, eds., 2020) 
 American Christmas Stories (Connie Willis, ed., 2021) 
 Women's Liberation! Feminist Writings that Inspired a Revolution and Still Can (Alix Kates Shulman and Honor Moore, eds., 2021) 
 The Future Is Female! More Classic Science Fiction Stories by Women (Lisa Yaszek, ed., 2022)

American poets project 
 American Wits: An Anthology of Light Verse (John Hollander, editor 2003) 
 Edna St. Vincent Millay: Selected Poems (J. D. McClatchy, editor 2003) 
 Edgar Allan Poe: Poems and Poetics (Richard Wilbur, editor 2003) 
 Poets of World War II (Harvey Shapiro, editor 2003) 
 Karl Shapiro: Selected Poems (John Updike, editor 2003) 
 Walt Whitman: Selected Poems (Harold Bloom, editor 2003) 
 Yvor Winters: Selected Poems (Thom Gunn, editor 2003) 
 John Berryman: Selected Poems (Kevin Young, editor 2004) 
 Kenneth Fearing: Selected Poems (Robert Polito, editor 2004) 
 Amy Lowell: Selected Poems (Honor Moore, editor 2004) 
 Muriel Rukeyser: Selected Poems (Adrienne Rich, editor 2004) 
 John Greenleaf Whittier: Selected Poems (Brenda Wineapple, editor 2004) 
 William Carlos Williams: Selected Poems (Robert Pinsky, editor 2004) 
 The Essential Gwendolyn Brooks (Elizabeth Alexander, editor 2005) 
 Emma Lazarus: Selected Poems (John Hollander, editor 2005) 
 Samuel Menashe: New and Selected Poems (Christopher Ricks, editor 2005) 
 Poets of the Civil War (J. D. McClatchy, editor 2005) 
 Theodore Roethke: Selected Poems (Edward Hirsch, editor 2005) 
 Edith Wharton: Selected Poems (Louis Auchincloss, editor 2005) 
 A. R. Ammons: Selected Poems (David Lehman, editor 2006) 
 Cole Porter: Selected Lyrics (Robert Kimball, editor 2006) 
 Louis Zukofsky: Selected Poems (Charles Bernstein, editor 2006) 
 American Sonnets (David Bromwich, editor 2007) 
 Kenneth Koch: Selected Poems (Ron Padgett, editor 2007) 
 Carl Sandburg: Selected Poems (Paul Berman, editor 2007) 
 Anne Stevenson: Selected Poems (Andrew Motion, editor 2007) 
 James Agee: Selected Poems (Andrew Hudgins, editor 2008) 
 Ira Gershwin: Selected Lyrics (Robert Kimball, editor 2009) 
 Poems from the Women's Movement (Honor Moore, editor 2009) 
 Stephen Foster & Co.: Lyrics of America's First Great Popular Songs (Ken Emerson, editor 2010) 
 Stephen Crane: Complete Poems (Christopher Benfey, editor 2011) 
 Countee Cullen: Collected Poems (Major Jackson, editor 2013)

Special publications 
 Isaac Bashevis Singer: An Album (Ilan Stavans, editor, 2004) 
 Farber on Film: The Complete Film Writings of Manny Farber (Robert Polito, editor, 2009) 
 Hub Fans Bid Kid Adieu: John Updike on Ted Williams (2010) 
 The Age of Movies: Selected Writings of Pauline Kael (Sanford Schwartz, editor, 2011) 
 The Collected Writings of Joe Brainard (Ron Padgett, editor, 2012) 
 Edgar Rice Burroughs, A Princess of Mars (2012) ; Tarzan of the Apes (2012) 
 American Pastimes: The Very Best of Red Smith (Daniel Okrent, editor, 2013) 
 The Top of His Game: The Best Sportswriting of W. C. Heinz (Bill Littlefield, editor, 2015) 
 President Lincoln Assassinated!! The Firsthand Story of the Murder, Manhunt, Trial, and Mourning (Harold Holzer, editor, 2015) 
 String Theory: David Foster Wallace on Tennis (2016) 
 My Dearest Julia: The Wartime Letters of Ulysses S. Grant to His Wife (2018) 
 Harold Bloom, The American Canon: Literary Genius from Emerson to Pynchon (David Mikics, editor, 2019) 
 Kate Bolick, Jenny Zhang, Carmen Maria Machado, and Jane Smiley, March Sisters: On Life, Death, and Little Women (2019) 
 Where the Light Falls: Selected Stories of Nancy Hale (Lauren Groff, editor, 2019) 
 The Peanuts Papers: Writers and Cartoonists on Charlie Brown, Snoopy and the Gang, and the Meaning of Life (Andrew Blauner, editor, 2019) 
 Walt Whitman Speaks: His Final Thoughts on Life, Writing, Spirituality, and the Promise of America, as Told to Horace Traubel (Brenda Wineapple, editor, 2019) 
 American Conservatism: Reclaiming an Intellectual Tradition (Andrew J. Bacevich, editor, 2020) 
 American Democracy: 21 Historic Answers to 5 Urgent Questions (Nicholas Lemann, editor, 2020) 
 The Collected Breece D'J Pancake: Stories, Fragments, Letters (2020) 
 Dolores Hitchens, Sleep with Strangers (2021) ; Sleep with Slander (2021) 
 Molière, The Complete Richard Wilbur Translations, volume 1 (2021) ; volume 2 (2021) 
 Mary Jane Ward, The Snake Pit (2021) 
 Richard Wright, The Man Who Lived Underground (2021) 
 Hannah Arendt, On Lying and Politics (2022) 
 Edward Hirsch, The Heart of American Poetry (2022) 
 Ronald L. Fair, Many Thousand Gone: An American Fable (2023) 
 Nancy Hale, The Prodigal Women (2023) 
 John A. Williams, The Man Who Cried I Am (2023)

See also 

 Bibliothèque de la Pléiade

Notes and references

Bibliography 
 Book Business: Publishing Past, Present, and Future by Jason Epstein, W. W. Norton & Company, 2001, 
 Michael Gorra, "The Library of America at Thirty", The Sewanee Review 120.4 (Fall 2012), 545–553. .

External links 
 
 List of all main series titles

1979 establishments in the United States
American writers' organizations
Book publishing companies of the United States
Literary publishing companies
Non-profit publishers
Publishing companies established in 1979
Series of books
Libraries established in 1979